An adenosine reuptake inhibitor (AdoRI) is a type of drug which acts as a reuptake inhibitor for the purine nucleoside and neurotransmitter adenosine by blocking the action of one or more of the equilibrative nucleoside transporters (ENTs). This in turn leads to increased extracellular concentrations of adenosine and therefore an increase in adenosinergic neurotransmission.

List of AdoRIs

 Acadesine
 Acetate
 Barbiturates
 Benzodiazepines
 Calcium channel blockers
 Carbamazepine
 Carisoprodol
 Cilostazol
 Cyclobenzaprine
 Dilazep
 Dipyridamole
 Estradiol
 Ethanol
 Flumazenil
 Hexobendine
 Hydroxyzine
 Indomethacin
 Inosine
 KF24345
 Meprobamate
 Nitrobenzylthioguanosine
 Nitrobenzylthioinosine
 Papaverine
 Pentoxifylline
 Phenothiazines
 Phenytoin
 Progesterone
 Propentofylline
 Propofol
 Puromycin
 R75231
 RE 102 BS
 Soluflazine
 Toyocamycin
 Tracazolate
 Tricyclic antidepressants

See also 
 Adenosinergic
 Reuptake inhibitor

References 

Drugs acting on the nervous system
Adenosine reuptake inhibitors